Tellmann is a surname. Notable people with the surname include:

Otto Tellmann (1927–2013), Romanian handball player and coach
Tom Tellmann (born 1954), American baseball player

See also
Tillmann